Thaís Fidélis dos Santos (born July 23, 2001) is a Brazilian artistic gymnast. She represented Brazil at the 2017 Artistic Gymnastics World Championships in Montreal, Quebec, Canada, where she placed fourth on the floor exercise.

Junior career

2016
In September, Thais Fidelis represented Brazil at the 2016 Pan American Individual Event Artistic Gymnastics Championships. She earned three medals: two silver medals (all-around and balance beam), and one gold medal (vault).

Senior career

2017
In March, Thais represented Brazil at the City of Jesolo Trophy where she earned a silver medal with the Brazilian team, behind the United States and ahead of Russia.

In May, Fidelis took part at the Koper World Challenge Cup, where she earned the bronze medal on the balance beam. That same month, she took two gold medals, on balance beam and floor exercise, at the Osijek World Challenge Cup. In September, Thais competed at the Varna Challenge Cup where she earned gold on the floor exercise and bronze on the uneven bars.

At the 2017 World Artistic Gymnastics Championships, in October, Thais became the first female Brazilian gymnast to qualify for the floor final since Daiane dos Santos in 2006. Fidelis placed fourth, the best international result from a female gymnast from Brazil at the World Championships since Jade Barbosa's fourth place on vault in 2011. She also qualified for the all-around final, where she finished 24th.

2018
In May, Thais Fidelis competed at the South American Games. She won the gold medal with the Brazilian team, and also earned an individual gold medal on the floor exercise.

In September, Filedis competed at the Pan American Championships where she earned the silver medal with the Brazilian team. At the World Championships she helped the Brazilian team qualify for the team final for the first time in eleven years, finishing seventh overall.

2019
Fidelis became the first female Brazilian gymnast to earn a medal in the all-around at the World Cup series, a bronze medal at the Birmingham World Cup in March.

References

External links 
 

2001 births
21st-century Brazilian women
Brazilian female artistic gymnasts
Competitors at the 2018 South American Games
Competitors at the 2019 Pan American Games
Competitors at the 2022 South American Games
Gymnasts at the 2019 Pan American Games
Living people
Medalists at the 2019 Pan American Games
Pan American Games bronze medalists for Brazil
Pan American Games medalists in gymnastics
People from Ribeirão Preto
South American Games gold medalists for Brazil
South American Games medalists in gymnastics
Sportspeople from São Paulo (state)
People from Barueri